Habarakadage Alosius Perera (10 May 1950 – 4 February 2010 as එච්. ඒ. පෙරේරා), popularly as H. A. Perera, was an actor in Sri Lankan cinema, theatre and television. He is considered one of five actors who have dominated the Sri Lankan Stage by critics.

Early years
Perera was born on 10 May 1950 in Colombo, Sri Lanka as the second child in a family of five. His mother was Palagame Arachchige Mary Theresa and his father was Habarakadage Vincent Perera. He started primary education at Modera St. James's Primary School. He studied at the same school until the second grade and entered the De La Salle College, Modara from the third grade. Educated at De La Salle College up to Ordinary Level, he entered Kotahena Central College to study for Advanced Level.

Perera died on 4 February 2010, aged 59, in hospital after a brief illness. His remains were kept at the Jayaratna Funeral Parlour from 5 February 2010. The funeral was held at the Madampitiya cemetery in Modera at 5.00 pm on 7 February 2010. He was survived by his sister.

Career
Perera made his way through several higher education schools and completed his studies in London. He first joined the street drama troupe of Gamini Haththettuvagama and made his first stage play Wedikkarayo. In 1973 he joined his first theatrical group. Perera joined Ranga Shilpa Shalika conducted by Dhamma Jagoda at Lionel Wendt Art Centre, to study music but found his career changed to acting.

Rajjiruwo Udai Udai was his first short stage play. He acted in stage plays such as Bosath Dekma, Raja Dekma, Spartacus, Wedikkarayo and Julius Caesar. He portrayed Jesus in Niriella's first film, Palamuveniya saha Anthimaya. In 1987, he appeared in the film for which he is best-remembered, Sumitra Peries' Sagara Jalaya Madi Haduwa Oba Hinda. He directed music in Niriella's stage plays and was the first instructor of Jana Karaliya.  At the 1981 Youth Drama Awards, Perera won the Best Musical Direction Award for the play Numba Vitarak Thala Eḷaluyi and then won Sarasaviya Award for Best Actor for the 1990 film Sagara Jalaya Madi Haduwa. In 1996, he won the State Drama Award for Best Actor for the stage play "Warenthuwa".

In 1982, Perera made his television debut with a role in Janelayan A Amutha. Subsequently, Perera has been a regular on television serials appearing in Doo Daruwo, Ingammaruwa, Nedeyo, Yaśōrāvaya, Kaḍa Ima, Senehevanthayō, Sūriya Daruvō among others. Especially his role of "Mr. Dias" in the serial Doo Daruwo, in particular, is an extraordinary figure who once immersed himself in society.

Filmography

References

External links

H. A. Perera's Biography in Sinhala Cinema Database

1950 births
2010 deaths
Sri Lankan Roman Catholics
Sri Lankan male film actors
Sinhalese male actors
People from Colombo
Kala Suri